Sherwood Manor can refer to:

 Sherwood Manor, Connecticut, United States
 Sherwood Manor (St. Michaels, Maryland), a home on the U.S. National Register of Historic Places